Allium kaschianum is a plant species from Central Asia (Xinjiang, Kazakhstan and Kyrgyzstan). It is found at elevations of 2400–3000 m.

Allium kaschianum produces a cluster of narrow bulbs up to 15 mm in diameter. 
Scape is up to 40 cm tall. Leaves are flat, long and narrow, about the same length as the scape. The umbel has pale purple flowers.

References

kaschianum
Onions
Flora of China
Flora of Xinjiang
Flora of Kazakhstan
Flora of Kyrgyzstan
Plants described in 1887